Sarcopera is a genus of flowering plants belonging to the family Marcgraviaceae.

Its native range is Central and Southern Tropical America.

Species:

Sarcopera anomala 
Sarcopera aurantiaca 
Sarcopera cordachida 
Sarcopera flammifera 
Sarcopera oxystylis 
Sarcopera rosulata 
Sarcopera sessiliflora 
Sarcopera tepuiensis

References

Marcgraviaceae
Ericales genera